Mason is the capital of Ingham County in the U.S. state of Michigan.  The population was 8,252 at the 2010 census.  Mason is the only city in the United States that serves as a county seat ahead of a state capital, as the nearby capital of Lansing is also largely located within Ingham County.  Mason was named after Stevens T. Mason, the state's first governor.

History
In 1836 Charles Noble knew that Michigan would be seeking a central location for a new capital when it became a state. He purchased an area of forest, cleared , and founded Mason Center.  The "Center" was soon dropped. In 1847, however, the state chose Lansing Township  northward to be its capital due to its potential for water power. Noble managed to make Mason the county seat instead. Ingham County's first downtown courthouse was built in 1843, and was replaced in 1858, and then again in 1905.

In 1865, Mason was incorporated as a village; in 1875 the town became a city. In the 1800s, Mason was the center of Ingham County activity, even more than was Lansing, the state capital. In 1877, Lansing attempted to take the status of county seat for itself, but the two cities made an agreement that moved some county offices and courts to Lansing in exchange for Mason remaining the county seat. As a result, Michigan is the only state in the country with a capital city that is not also a county seat.

Up into the early 1900s, the local Ojibwa tribe had a visible presence in the town. In the 1900s, The Wyeth Corporation began producing baby formula in Mason, but that was discontinued in the 1990s. Today, it is home to the headquarters of Dart Container Corporation. Michigan Packaging Company, Gestamp Hardtech, and Ingham Intermediate School District also have facilities in the Mason area.  Cattle can still be seen grazing within the city limits.

Geography
Sycamore Creek flows through the city.

Mason sits upon the Mason Esker, which is one of the longest eskers in the western hemisphere.

Transportation

 The Capital Area Transportation Authority (CATA) provides bus service from Lansing to Mason.  Route 46 runs weekdays from downtown Lansing to the southside of Mason.  The Mason Connector runs weekdays and Saturday from south Lansing to Mason.
 Jewett Field is a general aviation airport located southeast of Mason.  Scheduled passenger air carrier flights are provided by Capital Region International Airport located at the northwest corner of Ingham County.

Demographics

2010 census
As of the census of 2010, there were 8,252 people, 3,278 households, and 2,032 families residing in the city. The racial makeup of the city was 90.2% White, 5.9% African American, 0.4% Native American, 0.9% Asian, 0.8% from other races, and 1.7% from two or more races. Hispanic or Latino of any race were 3.7% of the population.

There were 3,278 households, of which 30.4% had children under the age of 18 living with them, 44.8% were married couples living together, 13.3% had a female householder with no husband present, 3.9% had a male householder with no wife present, and 38.0% were non-families. 32.6% of all households were made up of individuals, and 11.6% had someone living alone who was 65 years of age or older. The average household size was 2.29 and the average family size was 2.91.

The median age in the city was 37.8 years. 21.8% of residents were under the age of 18; 9.6% were between the ages of 18 and 24; 29.5% were from 25 to 44; 25.7% were from 45 to 64; and 13.5% were 65 years of age or older. The gender makeup of the city was 50.8% male and 49.2% female.

2000 census
As of the census of 2000, there were 6,714 people, 2,806 households, and 1,826 families residing in the city. The racial makeup of the city was 95.98% White, 0.64% African American, 0.46% Native American, 0.71% Asian, 0.74% from other races, and 1.46% from two or more races. Hispanic or Latino of any race were 2.73% of the population.

There were 2,806 households, out of which 33.0% had children under the age of 18 living with them, 48.7% were married couples living together, 12.5% had a female householder with no husband present, and 34.9% were non-families. 30.4% of all households were made up of individuals, and 11.0% had someone living alone who was 65 years of age or older. The average household size was 2.38 and the average family size was 2.96.

In the city, the population was spread out, with 25.6% under the age of 18, 8.3% from 18 to 24, 30.7% from 25 to 44, 22.0% from 45 to 64, and 13.4% who were 65 years of age or older. The median age was 36 years. For every 100 females, there were 89.8 males. For every 100 females age 18 and over, there were 85.0 males.

The median income for a household in the city was $41,790, and the median income for a family was $53,519. Males had a median income of $41,081 versus $26,266 for females. The per capita income for the city was $20,866. About 1.3% of families and 4.1% of the population were below the poverty line, including 1.7% of those under age 18 and 7.6% of those age 65 or over

Economy
 The Mason area is home to Dart Container Corporation, the largest manufacturer of foam cups and containers in the world. Dart is known for being vertically integrated, and is one of the largest privately owned corporations in Michigan. Dart Container also owns Solo.

Notable people
Steve Clark, a Mason native, plays professional soccer for Houston Dynamo in MLS.
 Ion Cortright, a 1907 graduate of Mason High School, is a former college football and men's basketball coach. During his coaching career, he was head coach for the University of South Dakota, University of Cincinnati, and North Dakota Agricultural College (now North Dakota State University).
 Alan Curtis, born in Mason in 1934 and a graduate of Mason High School in 1951, was a harpsichordist, musicologist and conductor of baroque opera.
 David Feintuch, author of the science fiction series the Seafort Saga, was a longtime resident of Mason.
 Mason is home to Kristin Haynie, a former point guard, who played in college basketball at Michigan State University. She played professionally in the Women's National Basketball Association and Europe. She is currently an assistant coach at Central Michigan University.
 John W. Longyear, a judge and politician, moved to Mason in 1844, where he taught school and studied law.
 Denny Stolz, a 1951 graduate of Mason High School, is a former college football coach. During his 23-year college coaching career, he was head coach for Alma College, Michigan State University, Bowling Green State University, and San Diego State University.
 Floyd Wilcox, born in Mason in 1886, was the third president of Shimer College.
 Malcolm X (then known as Malcolm Little) spent part of his childhood in the Ingham County Juvenile Home in Mason.

Notes

External links

 Official Website of the City of Mason
 Official Website of the Mason Area Chamber of Commerce
 Official Website of the Mason Public Schools

Cities in Ingham County, Michigan
County seats in Michigan
Lansing–East Lansing metropolitan area
Populated places established in 1836
1836 establishments in Michigan Territory